John Herbert Lee (9 November 1878 – 10 September 1947) was an Australian rules footballer who played with Geelong in the Victorian Football League (VFL).

Notes

External links 

1878 births
1947 deaths
Australian rules footballers from Victoria (Australia)
Geelong Football Club players